The Evliya Çelebi Way is a cultural trekking route celebrating the early stages of the journey made in 1671 to Mecca by the eponymous Ottoman Turkish gentleman-adventurer, Evliya Çelebi.  Evliya travelled the Ottoman Empire and beyond for some 40 years, leaving a 10 volume account of his journeys.

Route
The Evliya Çelebi Way is a c.600 km-long trail for horse-riders, hikers and bikers.  It begins at Hersek (a village in Altınova district), on the south coast of the Izmit Gulf, and traces Evliya's pilgrimage journey via Iznik, Yenişehir, Inegöl, Kütahya (his ancestral home), Afyonkarahisar, Uşak, Eski Gediz, and Simav. (Heavy urbanisation prevents the Way entering either Istanbul, from where he set out in 1671, or Bursa).

The Evliya Çelebi Way was inaugurated in autumn 2009 by a group of Turkish and British riders and academics.   A guidebook to the route, both English and Turkish, includes practical information for the modern traveller, day-by-day route descriptions, maps, photos, historical and architectural background, notes on the environment, and summaries of Evliya's description of places he saw when he travelled in the region, paired with what the visitor may see today.

References

Bibliography

See also
 Seyahatname
 Book of Travels
 Ottoman Empire
 Cornucopia Magazine
 Lycian Way
 St Paul Trail
 Turkish literature
 ibn Battuta

Horse trails
Hajj
Hiking trails in Turkey
2009 establishments in Turkey